Zagorsk Optical-Mechanical Plant is a company based in Sergiyev Posad, Russia. It is part of Shvabe Holding of Rostec.

The Zagorsk Optical-Mechanical Plant is a producer of precision optical equipment for the military, such as active infrared night vision devices and binoculars. It has increased the proportion of its civilian production, and adapted some of its military products, such as night vision devices, to civilian use.

On June 8 2022, the plant experienced a fire, as part of recent unusual fires in Russia.

References

External links
 Official website

Manufacturing companies of Russia
Companies based in Moscow Oblast
Shvabe Holding
Defence companies of the Soviet Union
Ministry of the Defense Industry (Soviet Union)